Blake, Cassels & Graydon LLP (Blakes) is an international corporate law firm with offices in Montreal, Ottawa, Toronto, Calgary, Vancouver, New York City, and London.

History 

Blakes was launched in 1856 after Dominick Edward Blake was called to the bar and entered into partnership with Stephen M. Jarvis in Toronto. Soon it was Blake & Blake when brother Samuel Hume Blake joined.

In 1867, Blakes incorporated what would become Canadian Imperial Bank of Commerce. The bank remains one of the firm's oldest clients. In 1878, Blakes was the first business in Canada to install a telephone system that provided a direct link to the offices of the Ontario Court of Appeal and the Supreme Court of Canada at Osgoode Hall.

In 1882, Zebulon Aiton Lash joined Blakes and began building a corporate law practice. By 1885, with 15 lawyers, Blakes was among the largest corporate law firms in the young Canadian Confederation.

In 1894, Clara Brett Martin articled at Blakes. She was called to the bar in 1897, becoming the first woman lawyer in Ontario and the British Empire.

In 1953, the firm's name was changed to Blake, Cassels & Graydon.

In 1998, the firm opened an office in Beijing.

In 2003, Blakes created the Daily Bread Toronto Law Firm Challenge, which engages a number of Toronto law firms to raise money for the Daily Bread Food Bank. T

In 2012, Blakes donated C$383,000 to the Fondation du Centre hospitalier de l'Université de Montréal (CHUM) and the McGill University Health Centre Foundation's (MUHC) joint corporate campaign to raise funds for university hospitals.

In 2013, Blakes assisted the 160 Girls project, an initiative promoted by non-profit organization The Equality Effect, achieve a landmark victory where Kenyan law enforcement officials were ordered to investigate and prosecute crimes of sexual violence.

In 2017, Blakes launched Nitro powered by Blakes, a program that provides access to legal services for emerging technology companies.

In 2019, Blakes was recognized as "one of Canada's Best Diversity Employers"  for the eighth time by Mediacorp Canada Inc. (previous wins include 2008 to 2011 and 2015 to 2017). The firm was also named Canada Law Firm of the Year in the Who’s Who Legal Awards for the 11th consecutive year.

Blakes was named one of Canada’s Best Diversity Employers for 2022 by Mediacorp Canada Inc., an honour we have received 12 times since 2008.

In 2022, the firm received the most top-tier rankings by practice area of any Canadian law firm for the sixth consecutive year in Chambers Global: The World’s Leading Lawyers for Business. In addition, the Firm’s lawyers continue to be recognized as leaders in their fields in The Canadian Legal Lexpert Directory, Canada's leading guide to lawyers.

Notable members and alumni
 Edward Blake
Walter Cassels
Peter Hogg
Zebulon Aiton Lash
 Clara Brett Martin

Further reading
Robert Brown, The House that Blakes Built (Toronto: Blake, Cassels, August 1980).
Joseph Schull, Edward Blake: The Man of the Other Way (1833-1881) (Toronto: MacMillan of Canada, 1975).

References 

Companies based in Toronto
Foreign law firms with offices in the United States
Law firms of Canada
Law firms established in 1856
1856 establishments in Ontario